ViaGen Pets, based in Cedar Park, Texas, is a division of TransOva Genetics, that offers animal cloning services to pet owners. ViaGen Pets division was launched in 2016.

ViaGen Pets offers cloning as well as DNA preservation services, sometimes called tissue or cell banking.

Technology and patents
ViaGen's subsidiary, Start Licensing, owns a cloning patent which is licensed to their only competitor as of 2018, who also offers animal cloning services.

The cloning process used by both ViaGen and their competitor is  somatic cell nuclear transfer, the same as which was used for cloning Dolly the Sheep.

History 
ViaGen Pets began by offering cloning to the livestock and equine industry in 2003, and later included cloning of cats and dogs in 2016.

References 

Cloning
Companies based in Texas
Companies based in Cedar Park, Texas
American companies established in 2016
Biotechnology companies of the United States

External Links 
  official website